Urodacus mckenziei is a species of scorpion in the Urodacidae family. It is endemic to Australia, and was first described in 2000 by Erich Volschenk, Graeme Smith and Mark Harvey.

Etymology
The species epithet mckenziei honours Norman I. McKenzie for contributions to knowledge of Australian biogeography.

Description
Colouration is mainly reddish-yellow, with some darker areas.

Distribution and habitat
The species is known only from the Carnarvon region of Western Australia.

References

 

 
mckenziei
Scorpions of Australia
Endemic fauna of Australia
Fauna of Western Australia
Animals described in 2000